Cosgrove Glacier is a small glacier entering the south part of Stefansson Bay just west of Mulebreen Glacier, Kemp Land, Antarctica. Seen from an Australian National Antarctic Research Expeditions aircraft in 1956 and later mapped, it was named by the Antarctic Names Committee of Australia for M. Cosgrove, radio supervisor at Mawson Station, 1959.

See also
 List of glaciers in the Antarctic
 Glaciology

References

 

Glaciers of Kemp Land